Petseling Monastery is a gompa in the dzong style of Bhutan built near Jakar, Bumthang District in  with support from the Penlop of Trongsa and the dzongpen (governor) of Jakar.

Like the great Boddhisattva Manjushri and Vairocana who lived for the welfare of all sentient beings, the highly accomplished master Drupthop Namgyal Lhundup, the First Petseling Trulku went to Lhasa and took a vow before Jow statue and started to recite Phagpa Zangpo Chodpai Monlam for the welfare of all sentient beings. At that time, the Jowo Statue spoke thus:

“Son! Don’t be very ambitious
Go instead to the south
East of Kurje Lhakhang in Bumthang is a place
Make it your monastic seat
You will fulfil your dreams
Name it Jangchub Pelri.”

East of Kurjue Lhakhang, this prophesied place is located atop a ridge and amidst forests where even tree branches bow as if to welcome all visitors. Wild flowers and medicinal herbs are common sight. One particular flower, Dongdola blossoms both in summer and winter and fill the whole area with sweet fragrance, like offerings to gods and goddesses. No wonder many birds including cuckoos make it their home and sing in praise of the monastery. The Monastery was built in 1769 with support from Trongsa Chila and Jakar Dzongpon, Bhutan.

References
Blossoms of Dongdola: Biographies of Drupthob Namgyal Lhundup and Successive Padtshaling Trulkus by Jangchub Pelri Dratshang (Chamkhar, Bumthang, Bhutan: Jangchub Pelri Dratshang, 2011).

Buddhist monasteries in Bhutan